Mor Militos Yuhanon is a Syriac Orthodox bishop in Malankara. He is the Metropolitan of Thumpamon and Patriarchal Vicar of Australia, New Zealand, and Singapore.

Early years
Yuhanon was born on 25 April 1957 to Rev.E.O.Thomas Cor-Episcopus and Thankamma in Elavinamannil family, Omallur, Pathanamthitta.
St.Stephen's Syriac Orthodox Church, Manjinikkara was his parish.

Education
Yuhanon  took his U. G. and P. G. from Kerala University, in History. His basic theological education is from Mor Ignatius Dayro Manjinikkara. Later he joined Serampore University as an external student and obtained Bachelor of Christian Studies (BCS) degree.

Priesthood
On 14 September 1976, at the age of 19, Yuhanon  was ordained deacon by Catholicose Mor Baselios Paulose II.

He was ordained Dn. E. T. John, Elavinamannil as Kassiso on 5 December 1982.

In 2000, Moran Mor Ignatius Zakka I Iwas, Prince Patriarch of Antioch and All the East appointed Fr. E. T. John, Elavinamannil as Reesh Dayaro and Managing Trustee of Piramadom Dayaro. Malankara Episcopal Synod selected Fr. E. T. John as the new metropolitan for Kollam and Thumpamon Dioceses. Moran Mor Ignatius Zakka I Iwas ordained him as Ramban and on 8 December 2002, as metropolitan by the name Mor Militos at Patriarchal Cathedral, Damascus.

Responsibilities
 Metropolitan of Thumpamon Diocese

See also 
Manjanikkara Dayara
Omallur
Syriac Orthodox Church

References 

Living people
1957 births
Syriac Orthodox Church bishops
Indian Oriental Orthodox Christians
People from Omallur
University of Kerala alumni
Senate of Serampore College (University) alumni